The 1931 Kerry Senior Football Championship was the 33rd staging of the Kerry Senior Football Championship since its establishment by the Kerry County Board in 1889.

Rock Street entered the championship as the defending champions.

The final was played on 10 January 1932 at Tralee Sportsfield, between Rock Street and Boherbee, in what was their second meeting in the final and a first in two years. Rock Street won the match by 2-07 to 1-03 to claim their third championship title overall and a second title in succession.

Results

Final

Championship statistics

Miscellaneous

 Rock Street win the double for the second time in three seasons by also winning the Kerry Senior Hurling Championship.

References

Kerry Senior Football Championship
1931 in Gaelic football